Bilal Šuman (born 9 June 1968) is a Bosnian former handball player and current coach. He coached Danish Men's Handball League club KIF Kolding and the Bosnia and Herzegovina national team.

Career
As a player, he played in the right wing position for Igman Ilidža and Eurofarm Pelister 2 in the former Yugoslavia and for KIF Kolding in Denmark and has also represented the Bosnia and Herzegovina men's national handball team, making 32 appearances and scoring 124 goals. 

As a coach, Šuman worked at Kolding where he won the 2013–14 Håndboldligaen and qualified Bosnia and Herzegovina for the 2020 EHF European Men's Handball Championship. He remained as Bosnia's coach until 17 February 2021.

Personal life
Šuman's son, Benjamin, is also a professional handball player who plays as a left winger for his father's former club Kolding.

Honours

Player
KIF Kolding
Danish Men's Handball League: 1992–93, 2000–01, 2001–02, 2002–03, 2004–05, 2005–06
Danish Men's Handball Cup: 1998–99, 2001–02, 2004–05

Coach
KIF Kolding
Danish Men's Handball League: 2013–14

Individual
Bosnia and Herzegovina Coach of the Year: 2019

References

External links

Bilal Šuman at Sofascore
Bilal Šuman at globalsportsarchive.com

1968 births
Living people
Sportspeople from Sarajevo
Bosnia and Herzegovina male handball players
Expatriate handball players
Bosnia and Herzegovina expatriate sportspeople in Denmark
Bosnia and Herzegovina expatriate sportspeople in North Macedonia
KIF Kolding players
Bosnia and Herzegovina handball coaches
Handball coaches of international teams